The 1767 Milestones are historic milestones located along the route of the Upper Boston Post Road between the cities of Boston and Springfield in Massachusetts. The 40 surviving milestones were added to the National Register of Historic Places in 1971. Massachusetts has a total of 129 surviving milestones including those along the upper Post Road. The stones are so named, despite having been placed in many different years, because of a 1767 directive of the Province of Massachusetts Bay that such stones be placed along major roadways. The state highway department was directed in 1960 to undertake their preservation. Many of them underwent a major restoration in 2018.

The first stone was erected by Paul Dudley, one of the prominent citizens of early 18th century Massachusetts, in Roxbury, which was at the time a separate community. Roxbury was located at the end of the Boston Neck, a narrow isthmus separating the mainland from the Shawmut Peninsula, where Boston was located. Travelers going by land from Boston to other areas had to travel over the neck and through Roxbury to reach their destinations. The Roxbury junction where Dudley placed the first stone was where several routes branched, heading south and west across New England.

Dudley erected several stones along the road from Boston to Cambridge which wound its way from Beacon Hill along what is now Washington Street through the Dudley Square area to what is now Huntington Avenue, then along Harvard Street through Brookline Village, Coolidge Corner, and Allston crossing into Cambridge at the Great Bridge, where modern JFK Street in Cambridge becomes North Harvard Street in Allston. The stones that Dudley erected have the initials PD on them, usually at the bottom of the stone. The most chatty of these milestones (not part of this collection), is inscribed P Dudley rather than PD, and is located on the corner of Centre and South Streets in Jamaica Plain.

The stones listed for miles 23 through 29 in Wayland and Sudbury are actually guideposts rather than milestones, and do not list any mileage. They were erected at road intersections rather than at the mile marks. The stones are quarried granite posts with plug & feather tool marks and post-date 1800.

See also 

 National Register of Historic Places listings in northern Boston, Massachusetts
 National Register of Historic Places listings in southern Boston, Massachusetts
 National Register of Historic Places listings in Brookline, Massachusetts
 National Register of Historic Places listings in Cambridge, Massachusetts
 National Register of Historic Places listings in Middlesex County, Massachusetts
 National Register of Historic Places listings in Worcester County, Massachusetts
 National Register of Historic Places listings in Hampden County, Massachusetts

References 

National Register of Historic Places in Suffolk County, Massachusetts
National Register of Historic Places in Middlesex County, Massachusetts
National Register of Historic Places in Worcester County, Massachusetts
Road transportation buildings and structures on the National Register of Historic Places
Individual signs on the National Register of Historic Places
Individual signs in the United States
Transportation buildings and structures on the National Register of Historic Places in Massachusetts